is a Japanese fashion model, actress, and singer.

Filmography
 (2003) as Meiko Nakano
 (2003)
Nine Souls (2003)
 (2005) as Reiko Matsuhara
 (2005) as Sacchin
FLOWERS (2005)
Sleeping Flower (2005)
Colors (2006)
Love My Life (2006) as Eri Joujima
Life (2006) 
 (2006)
Baumkuchen (2006)

Discography
A work of the IMAJUKU name
Singles
Feel Like Makin'(1999)
Chedi EP(1999)
PARADISE(1999)
Albums
ibiza(1999)
“cat's cradle”～imajuku remix(1999)
imajuku cafe(2001)

A work of the Asami Imajuku name
Compilation album "Wild Flowers"(2001)

External links
 etrenne official site
 imajuku.com
Asami Imajuku blog

Living people
1978 births
Japanese actresses
Japanese female models
People from Miyazaki Prefecture
Musicians from Miyazaki Prefecture
21st-century Japanese singers
Models from Miyazaki Prefecture